Love and Death is a 1975 American comedy film written and directed by Woody Allen. It is a satire on Russian literature starring Allen and Diane Keaton as Boris and Sonja, Russians living during the Napoleonic Era who engage in mock-serious philosophical debates. Allen considered it the funniest film he had made up until that point.

Plot
When Napoleon (James Tolkan) invades Austria during the Napoleonic Wars, Boris Grushenko (Woody Allen), a coward and pacifist scholar, is forced to enlist in the Russian army. Desperate and disappointed after hearing the news that Sonja (Diane Keaton), his cousin twice removed, is to wed a herring merchant, he inadvertently becomes a war hero. Boris returns and marries the recently widowed Sonja, who does not want to marry him, but promises him that she will, in order to make him happy for one night, when she thinks that he is about to be killed in a duel. To her surprise and disappointment, he survives the duel. Their marriage is filled with philosophical debates but no money. Their life together is interrupted when Napoleon invades the Russian Empire. Boris wants to flee but his wife, angered that the invasion will interfere with their plans to start a family that year, conceives a plot to assassinate Napoleon at his headquarters in Moscow. Boris and Sonja debate the matter with some degree of philosophical doublespeak, and Boris reluctantly goes along with it. They fail to kill Napoleon and Sonja escapes arrest while Boris is executed, despite being told by a vision that he will be pardoned. Boris' ghost bids goodbye to Sonja and the audience before dancing away with Death.

Cast

 Woody Allen as Boris Grushenko
 Diane Keaton as Sonja
 James Tolkan as Napoleon
 Harold Gould as Anton Ivanovich Lebedokov
 Olga Georges-Picot as Countess Alexandrovna 
 Beth Porter as Anna
 Zvee Scooler as Father
 Jessica Harper as Natasha
 Féodor Atkine as Mikhail Grushenko
 Despo Diamantidou as Boris' mother
 Yves Barsacq as Rimsky
 Yves Brainville as Andre
 Brian Coburn as Dimitri
 Tony Jay as Vladimir Maximovitch
 Howard Vernon as Gen. Leveque
 Aubrey Morris as Soldier 4
 Alfred Lutter as Young Boris
 Georges Adet as Old Nehamkin
 Sol Frieder as Voskovec
 Lloyd Battista as Don Francisco
 Frank Adu as Drill Sergeant

Production
Allen shot the film in France and Hungary, where he had to deal with unfavorable weather, spoiled negatives, food poisoning, physical injuries and communication difficulties. Consequently, he swore never to shoot a film outside the United States again. However, starting in 1996 with Everyone Says I Love You, Allen did in fact shoot a number of films abroad.

Style
Coming between Allen's Sleeper (1973) and Annie Hall (1977), Love and Death is in many respects an artistic transition between the two. Allen pays tribute to the humor of The Marx Brothers, Bob Hope and Charlie Chaplin throughout the film.

The dialogue and scenarios parody Russian novels, particularly those by Dostoyevsky and Tolstoy, such as The Brothers Karamazov, Crime and Punishment, The Gambler, The Idiot and War and Peace. This includes a dialogue between Boris and his father in which each line alludes to, or is composed entirely of, Dostoyevsky titles.

The use of Prokofiev on the soundtrack adds to the Russian flavor of the film. Prokofiev's "Troika" from the Lieutenant Kijé Suite is featured prominently, for the film's opening and closing credits and in selected scenes in the film when a "bouncy" theme is required. The battle scene is accompanied with music from Prokofiev's Alexander Nevsky cantata. Boris is marched to his execution to the "March" from Prokofiev's The Love for Three Oranges.

Some of the humor is straightforward; other jokes rely on the viewer's awareness of classic literature or contemporary European cinema. For example, the final shot of Keaton is a reference to Ingmar Bergman's Persona. The sequence with the stone lions is a parody of Sergei Eisenstein's Battleship Potemkin, while the Russian battle against Napoleon's army heavily parodies the same film's "Odessa steps" sequence. Bergman's The Seventh Seal is parodied several times, including during the climax.

Reception
The film grossed over $20 million in North America, making it the 18th highest grossing picture of 1975 in North America (theatrical rentals were $5 million).

At Rotten Tomatoes, 21 out of 21 critics—including three of the site's "top critics"—consider the film "fresh", with a 100% rating and a weighted average of 8.13/10. The site's consensus reads: "Woody Allen plunks his neurotic persona into a Tolstoy pastiche and yields one of his funniest films, brimming with slapstick ingenuity and a literary inquiry into subjects as momentous as Love and Death".

At the 25th Berlin International Film Festival in 1975, the film won the Silver Bear for outstanding artistic contribution.

Roger Ebert gave it three and a half stars:

Miss Keaton is very good in Love and Death, perhaps because here she gets to establish and develop a character, instead of just providing a foil, as she's often done in other Allen films ... There are dozens of little moments when their looks have to be exactly right, and they almost always are. There are shadings of comic meaning that could have gotten lost if all we had were the words, and there are whole scenes that play off facial expressions. It's a good movie to watch just for that reason, because it's been done with such care, love and lunacy.

Gene Siskel awarded a full four stars and wrote, "Woody Allen is simply terrific in 'Love and Death.' To my mind, it's his funniest film. He plays to his greatest strength (gag line dialog) and stays away from what has limited his other movies (an attempt to develop a story)." Vincent Canby of The New York Times called the film "Woody Allen's grandest work" and "side-splitting." Charles Champlin of the Los Angeles Times declared, "Thin but likable just about sums it up." Gary Arnold of The Washington Post found the film "funny with remarkable and delightful consistency." Penelope Gilliatt of The New Yorker thought that Woody Allen and Diane Keaton "have become an unbeatable new team at pacing haywire intellectual backchat. Their style works as if each of them were a less mock-assertive Groucho Marx with a duplicate of him to play against. For such a recklessly funny film, the impression is weirdly serene." Geoff Brown of The Monthly Film Bulletin wrote that "the occasional longueurs and dud jokes never prove fatal to the movie's overall success; to use the description Boris applies to his father, Woody Allen is a 'major loon' and Love and Death provides a fine showcase for his talent."

In September 2008, in a poll held by Empire magazine, the film was voted as the 301st greatest film out of a list of 500. In October 2013, the film was voted by the Guardian readers as the seventh-best film directed by Woody Allen.

Comedian and filmmaker Bill Hader talked about his appreciation of the film, having listed it as one of his favorite films saying, "I love Diane Keaton in this movie so much. My first real movie crush. It’s nonstop jokes, but its played very real and loose, and it has the starkness of a Bergman movie! It’s insane, yet it completely works."

Soundtrack
The Magic Flute Overture, K620 (1791) by Wolfgang Amadeus Mozart
Lieutenant Kijé Suite for Orchestra, Op. 60 (1934) by Sergei Prokofiev
Alexander Nevsky, Cantata for Mezzo-soprano, Chorus, & Orchestra, Op. 78 (1938) by Sergei Prokofiev
The Love for Three Oranges, Suite for Orchestra, Op. 33 (1919) by Sergei Prokofiev
String Quintet in E, Op. 13 No. 5: III. Minuet by Luigi Boccherini
Scythian Suite, for Orchestra, Op. 20 by Sergei Prokofiev

References

External links

 
 
 
 

1975 films
1975 comedy films
1970s English-language films
1970s parody films
American parody films
Films directed by Woody Allen
Films produced by Charles H. Joffe
Films set in the 1810s
Films set in Russia
Films shot in France
Films shot in Hungary
Films with screenplays by Woody Allen
Napoleonic Wars films
Silver Bear for outstanding artistic contribution
United Artists films
1970s American films